Nurzhan Kermenbayev (born February 17, 1989 in Satpayev, Kazakh SSR, Soviet Union (present Kazakhstan)) is a Kazakh singer who rose to popularity after winning (contestant no. 360513) SuperStar KZ 3, the Kazakh version of Pop Idol. Nurzhan is known by the nickname "Капкарашка" (Kapkarashka).

SuperStar KZ 3 performances
Semi Finals: 
Top 12: "Billie Jean" by Michael Jackson
Top 11: "Небо" by Diskoteka Avariya
Top 10: "Если У Вас Нету Тёти" by Aleksandr Aronov
Top 9: "Bailamos" by Enrique Iglesias
Top 8: "Мәңгілікке" by Almas Kishkenbayev
Top 7: "Aïcha" by Outlandish
Top 6: "Алдайды" by Almas Kishkenbayev
Top 5: "Words" by FR David
Top 5:
Top 4: "Desert Rose" by Sting
Top 4: "Две Звезды" by Alla Pugacheva (with Nagima Eskalieva)
Top 3: "A Song for Mama" by Boyz II Men
Top 3: "Hafanana" by Afric Simone
Grand Final: "Сенен Баска"
Grand Final: "Любимая"
Grand Final: "Отан Ана" by Batyrkhan Shukenov

References 

1989 births
Living people
SuperStar KZ
Idols (franchise) participants
Idols (TV series) winners
21st-century Kazakhstani male singers